Ioannes Paulus II Peninsula is an ice-covered peninsula on the north coast of Livingston Island in the South Shetland Islands, Antarctica that is bounded by Hero Bay to the east and Barclay Bay to the west. It extends 13 km in length in north–south direction and is 8 km wide. Its north extremity is formed by the ice-free Cape Shirreff, an area visited by early 19th century sealers.  The peninsula's interior is occupied by Oryahovo Heights.

The feature is named after Pope John Paul II (1920–2005) for his contribution to world peace and understanding among people.

Location

See also
 Oryahovo Heights
 Cape Shirreff
 Porlier Bay
 Livingston Island

Maps
 L.L. Ivanov et al. Antarctica: Livingston Island and Greenwich Island, South Shetland Islands. Scale 1:100000 topographic map. Sofia: Antarctic Place-names Commission of Bulgaria, 2005.
 L.L. Ivanov. Antarctica: Livingston Island and Greenwich, Robert, Snow and Smith Islands. Scale 1:120000 topographic map. Troyan: Manfred Wörner Foundation, 2010.  (First edition 2009. )
 Antarctic Digital Database (ADD). Scale 1:250000 topographic map of Antarctica. Scientific Committee on Antarctic Research (SCAR). Since 1993, regularly upgraded and updated.
 L.L. Ivanov. Antarctica: Livingston Island and Smith Island. Scale 1:100000 topographic map. Manfred Wörner Foundation, 2017.

Gallery

References
 Ioannes Paulus II Peninsula. SCAR Composite Antarctic Gazetteer
 Bulgarian Antarctic Gazetteer. Antarctic Place-names Commission. (details in Bulgarian, basic data in English)

External links
 Ivanov, L. General Geography and History of Livingston Island. In: Bulgarian Antarctic Research: A Synthesis. Eds. C. Pimpirev and N. Chipev. Sofia: St. Kliment Ohridski University Press, 2015. pp. 17–28. 
 Ioannes Paulus II Peninsula. Copernix satellite image

Peninsulas of Livingston Island
Pope John Paul II